The Troll Garden is a collection of short stories by Willa Cather, published in 1905.

Contents
This collection contains the following seven stories:
 "Flavia and Her Artists"
 "The Sculptor's Funeral"
 "A Death in the Desert"
 "The Garden Lodge"
 "The Marriage of Phaedra"
 "A Wagner Matinee"
 "Paul's Case"

Four of these stories--"The Sculptor's Funeral," "A Death in the Desert," "A Wagner Matinee," and "Paul's Case"—were revised and included in Cather's next collection of short fiction Youth and the Bright Medusa, published in 1920.

References

External links
 
 

1905 short story collections
Short story collections by Willa Cather